Astronautics Corporation of America (ACA) was established in 1959 and is a US supplier, designer, and manufacturer of avionics equipment to airlines, governments, commercial and defense aircraft manufacturers, and other avionics systems integrators. Products are used for air, sea, ground, missile and space applications.  Over 150,000 aircraft have been equipped with Astronautics equipment. Astronautics products electronic flight instrument systems, electronic flight bags, engine indicating and crew alerting systems, network server systems, multifunction displays, mission and display processors and systems, flight directors, flight control systems, inertial guidance systems, air data computers, and autopilots.

History
In June 1959, in Milwaukee, Wisconsin, brother and sister Nate Zelazo and Norma Paige started the Astronautics Corporation of America as an advanced technology aerospace company. Zelazo had been employed by the Navy Department, and the company's small staff had an extensive background in designing and developing flight instrumentation. The company began to seek business with the military, initially working with local universities, and obtained a program from the US Air Force investigating fuel management techniques for space vehicle orbital rendezvous. It later sought further involvement in Navy, Army and Air Force flight instrumentation production programs.

In the latter half of the 1960s, Astronautics received backing from the American City Bank and Trust Company, which became bankrupt in the 1973-75 recession; Zelazo hired its former CEO, Pete Erickson, as Astronautics' CFO in 1976.  Erickson worked for the company for thirteen years until his retirement, investing in the stock and bond market and arranging the purchase of a corporate building on Teutonia Avenue in the city's west side in 1982.  He also handled the financial side of the purchase of Astronautics' subsidiary, Kearfott Corporation, in 1988 from Singer Corporation.

After participating in several production programs for aircraft flight instruments for the military, Astronautics developed a design and production capability, and began supplying flight instrumentation for aircraft such as the B-52, F-4, A-4, C-130, UH-1, P-3 and many others. This capability was soon expanded to provide the complete flight director systems, which included the flight director computer, for several military aircraft.

As military flight instrumentation advanced, Astronautics began competing for the Cathode Ray Tube (CRT) technology that was being applied to aircraft instrumentation. The company entered into a contract to provide the Horizontal Situation Display (HSD) for the Air Force F-111 Aircraft. This display program, which combined CRT and optical technologies, resulted in further expansion of Astronautics Engineering, Quality, Reliability, Production and Contract Administration Departments. Astronautics then also developed the Head Up Display for both the A-10 Aircraft and the Shuttle trainer aircraft. Astronautics then supplied medical monitors for CAT scanners and also supplied displays to NASA for the mission control center in Houston, Texas. Astronautics became an avionics supplier to the Italian, German and British governments for their high-performance aircraft.

Astronautics then made developments in flat panel displays and digital avionics. The company supplied both military and civilian aircraft with avionics and airborne servers. after acquiring Kearfott Guidance & Navigation Corporation in 1988, Astronautics  provided inertial navigation systems for space and maritime use.

Astronautics produced a low-end supercomputer, the ZS-1, designed by James Smith of the University of Wisconsin; one was manufactured, but the model did not sell, and is exhibited at the Rhode Island Computer Museum. An RICM member believes about 20 machines were made, most sold to NASA, however, this needs verification as this is currently lacking citation.

Astronautics purchased a new corporate building in Oak Creek, Wisconsin in early 2019, and have moved most personnel to this new building in early 2020.

Products

Astronautics major product lines include:

Integrated Avionics System
Displays - CRT and flat panel
Electronic flight bag
Mission & Display Processors
Electronic Flight Instrument System
Engine Indicating & Crew Alerting Systems
Electromechanical Navigation & Flight Instruments
Control and Display Units/Control Consoles
Airborne File Servers
Network Server Systems
Air data computers
Flap Control Systems
High Accuracy Guidance and Navigation Systems
Fire Control/Thermal Imaging Systems
Enhanced Vision Systems
Gyroscopes, Resolvers, Synchros, Motors, Actuators
Magnetic refrigeration
Worldwide Maintenance Services

References

 Fumo, Joe (February 1986). "Astronautics, A Low Profile Company with a High-Tech Reputation", Wisconsin Business.
 Decker, Eric (April 17, 2006). "Ventures: Blue Ocean Strategies", Biz Times.

External links
Astronautics.com

Aerospace companies of the United States
Companies based in Wisconsin
Companies based in Milwaukee
Defense companies of the United States
Multinational aircraft manufacturers
1959 establishments in Wisconsin